HNSKY or Hallo Northern Sky is a popular free and open-source planetarium program for Linux, macOS, Microsoft Windows, and Raspberry Pi to simulate the night sky. It is provided with several non-English language modules, numerous astronomical catalogues, conversion utilities and tools, as well as several stellar databases.

HNSKY was originally created by Dutchman Han Kleijn in 1998, who continues to develop and maintain the application. It is available in both 32 bit and 64 bit versions.

Initially a basic planetarium program, it has expanded in functionality to include the ability to control computerized GoTo telescope mounts, and is ASCOM and INDI compliant and supports the USNO's UCAC catalogs and ESA Gaia data.

See also

Space flight simulation game
List of space flight simulation games
Planetarium software
List of observatory software

References

External links
 Hallo Northern Sky Home Page

Astronomy software
Science software for Windows
Science software for Linux
Pascal (programming language) software